The 1961 Ice Hockey World Championships was the 28th edition of the Ice Hockey World Championships. The tournament was held in Geneva and Lausanne, Switzerland from 1 to 12 March 1961. The games were played outdoors on a frozen pool. A glare made it hard for players to see well, however photographers were able to get aerial pictures from the diving board. Canada, represented by the Trail Smoke Eaters, won their nineteenth international title. It would be 33 years before Canada won another World Championship. By beating out the Soviets for the Silver, the Czechoslovaks won their tenth European title.  The final day was marred by political controversy when Willi Daume, president of West Germany hockey, forbade his team to take the ice against East Germany to avoid the possibility of honouring the East German's new flag.

A record twenty nations participated in three groups, with South Africa appearing for the first time. Teams were divided into the three tiers, roughly following the 1959 championships, and using qualification games, to establish an eight-team group A, a six-team group B, and a six-team group C.  The South African team did not have the minimum number of players so forty-five-year-old federation president Tom Durling played despite not actually being a citizen of the country. Promotion and relegation did not begin yet, but it was a big step towards formulating the process.

Qualification matches for Group A and B
The nations who finished 1st through 6th in 1959 played in Group A.  The nation ranked 7th played the hosts, and 8th played 9th to qualify the final two entries.

World Championship Group A (Switzerland)

Final Round

Qualification matches for Group B and C
The losers of the Group A qualifiers (Switzerland and Norway), were joined by the nations who finished 10th and 11th (Italy and Poland) in 1959.  Remaining countries that wished to play at this level played qualification games.

World Championship Group B (Switzerland)

Final Round

World Championship Group C (Switzerland)

Final Round

Ranking and statistics

Tournament Awards
Best players selected by the directorate:
Best Goaltender:       Seth Martin
Best Defenceman:       Ivan Tregubov
Best Forward:          Vlastimil Bubník
Media All-Star Team:
Goaltender:  Seth Martin
Defence:  Darryl Sly,  Harry Smith
Forwards:  Michel Legacé,  Boris Mayorov,  Miroslav Vlach

Final standings
The final standings of the tournament according to IIHF:

European championships final standings
The final standings of the European championships according to IIHF:

Notes

References

Championnat du monde 1961

Ottawa Citizen - 3 Feb 1961
The Montreal Gazette - 6 Feb 1961
The Hartford Courant, 6 Feb 1961, page 15
New York Times, 12 February 1961, Page S6
The Montreal Gazette - 13 Feb 1961
The Pittsburgh Press - 17 Feb 1961
Ottawa Citizen - 1 Mar 1961
Tri City Herald - 8 Mar 1961
The Montreal Gazette - 9 Mar 1961
The Montreal Gazette - 11 Mar 1961

IIHF Men's World Ice Hockey Championships
World Championships|World Championships
International ice hockey competitions hosted by Switzerland
March 1961 sports events in Europe
Sports competitions in Geneva
Sports competitions in Lausanne
20th century in Geneva
20th century in Lausanne